The Afghanistan national cricket team toured Canada from 2 to 9 August 2011. The tour consisted of one ICC Intercontinental Cup match against the Canada national cricket team and a pair of One Day Internationals (ODI) for the 2011–13 ICC Intercontinental Cup One-Day. Afghanistan won the Intercontinental Cup and both of the following ODIs.

Intercontinental Cup

Intercontinental Cup One-Day

1st ODI

2nd ODI

References

External links
 

Canada
Afghan
2011
International cricket competitions in 2011
International cricket tours of North America
2011 in Ontario
International cricket tours of Canada